Khao Saming is a district (amphoe) in Trat province, eastern Thailand.

History
The district was established in 1898, but its name and the location of the district office had changed several times in its history. At first named Si Bua Thong, then Thung Yai, it was finally renamed Khao Saming when the district office was moved to Ban Tha Kathon in Tambon Khao Saming. The present district office building was opened on 14 February 2000.

Geography
Neighboring districts are (from the north clockwise) Khlung of Chanthaburi province, Bo Rai, Mueang Trat, Laem Ngop of Trat Province.

Administration
The district is divided into eight sub-districts (tambons), which are further subdivided into 66 villages (mubans). Two townships (thesaban tambon) are in the district: Saen Tung covers parts of the tambon Saen Tung, and Khao Saming covers parts of the tambon Khao Saming and Thung Nonsi. There are a further eight tambon administrative organizations (TAO).

Khao Saming